Zizur Mayor (Basque: Zizur Nagusia) is a municipality in the Spanish autonomous community of Navarra, in northern Spain.

References

External links

Ayuntamiento de Zizur Mayor / Zizur Nagusia
 ZIZUR MAYOR / ZIZUR NAGUSIA in the Bernardo Estornés Lasa - Auñamendi Encyclopedia (Euskomedia Fundazioa) 

Municipalities in Navarre